Sir David Lincoln Lightbown (30 November 1932 – 12 December 1995) was the Conservative Member of Parliament for South East Staffordshire from 1983 until he died in office in 1995 aged 63 (he suffered a heart attack while watching a rugby match). The resulting by-election for his seat was won by the Labour Party candidate Brian Jenkins.

During his time in Parliament Lightbown served as a government whip. His imposing physique and reputation for robust methods led to him being branded “the Terminator”.

References

Times Guide to the House of Commons, Times Newspapers Limited, 1992.

1932 births
1995 deaths
Conservative Party (UK) MPs for English constituencies
UK MPs 1983–1987
UK MPs 1987–1992
UK MPs 1992–1997
Knights Bachelor